Francis Kimball may refer to:

 Francis D. Kimball (1820–1856), Republican politician from Ohio
 Francis H. Kimball (1845–1919), American architect

See also
 Frank J. Kimball (1846–1927), Republican politician from Wisconsin